The Malagasy white-bellied free-tailed bat (Mops leucostigma) is a species of bat in the family Molossidae. It is endemic to Madagascar.

Sources

Mops (bat)
Bats of Africa
Endemic fauna of Madagascar
Mammals of Madagascar
Taxonomy articles created by Polbot
Taxa named by Joel Asaph Allen
Mammals described in 1918